An Identicon is a visual representation of a hash value, usually of an IP address, that serves to identify a user of a computer system as a form of avatar while protecting the user's privacy. The original Identicon was a 9-block graphic, and the representation has been extended to other graphic forms by third parties.

Invention 

Don Park came up with the Identicon idea on January 18, 2007.  In his words:

A similar method had previously been described by Adrian Perrig and Dawn Song in their 1999 publication on hash visualization, which had already seen wide use such as in the random art of SSH keys.

Applications 

 GitHub uses identicons to visually differentiate users who have not set their own avatar.
 Wikis and blogs may generate identicons to visually identify authors based on IP addresses. This provides some protection against impersonation without requiring authentication.
 Third-party software is available to generate identicons for the purposes of identifying eBay sellers.
 The original Identicon idea has been expanded to include a couple of new, simple yet very effective, anti-phishing protection schemes. One of them requires client-side support; Park is interested in talking to browser vendors regarding its incorporation. He calls this expansion "Gemini."
 There is an add-on for Firefox called IdentFavIcon Quantum that, on websites without favicons, replaces them in the tab with Identicons based on the IP address of the website.
 Anonymous email forwarding service IdBloc uses Identicons to help quickly distinguish between different email addresses visually

References

External links 
 Don Park's original source code at GitHub
 Mavenized project based on Don Park's original source code at GitHub
 Identicons as Visual Fingerprints by Phil Haack
 PHP-Identicons
 Identicon CFC - ColdFusion implementation of Identicons
 Sigil
 NIdenticon - .Net implementation of Identicons
 Identicons used in the wild by IdBloc

Hash functions
Computer icons
Internet forum terminology
Web 2.0 neologisms
Identifiers